Andrey Malikov (born 7 May 1954) is a Soviet speed skater. He competed in two events at the 1976 Winter Olympics.

References

External links
 

1954 births
Living people
Soviet male speed skaters
Olympic speed skaters of the Soviet Union
Speed skaters at the 1976 Winter Olympics
Place of birth missing (living people)